Mie bakso is an Indonesian noodle soup dish consists of bakso meatballs served with yellow noodles and rice vermicelli. This dish well known in Chinese Indonesian, Javanese and Malay cuisine. Mie bakso is almost identical with soto mie, only this dish has meatball instead of slices of chicken meat. 

Mie bakso can be found all across Indonesia, from street vendors to high-class restaurants. Along with soto, satay and siomay, mie bakso is one of the most popular street foods in Indonesia.

Condiments
 Fried shallots, crisp fried shallot sprinkled upon bakso.
 Sweet soy sauce, to add mild sweetness.
 Sambal, chili paste to add spiciness.
 Bottled hot sauce.
 Ketchup, tomato sauce.
 Vinegar, to add sourness.
 Tauge, bean sprouts.
 Tongcay, preserved salted vegetables.

See also

Cuisine of Indonesia
Javanese cuisine
Malay cuisine
Bakso
Mie ayam
Mie soto
Mie goreng

References

Indonesian Chinese cuisine
Indonesian noodle dishes
Indonesian soups
Javanese cuisine
Malay cuisine
Meatballs
Noodle soups
Street food in Indonesia